Donnie Radcliffe (July 13, 1929 – February 19, 2010) was a journalist for The Washington Post and a biographer who wrote biographies of First Ladies Barbara Bush and Hillary Clinton.

Books

Simply Barbara Bush: A Portrait of America's Candid First Lady. 
Hillary Rodham Clinton: A First Lady for Our Time. .

References

1929 births
2010 deaths
American biographers